GS Group is a South Korean conglomerate. GS comprises GS Holdings, subsidiaries & affiliates including GS Caltex, GS Retail, GS Shop, GS EPS, GS Global, GS Sports and GS E&C among others. The asset size is 65.4 trillion KRW at the end of 2019 placing GS as the 8th largest chaebol in Korea excluding the public business companies.

GS Holdings was incorporated in July 2004 and officially split from LG Group in January 2005, with the Koo family gaining full control over LG Group and the Huh family creating GS Holdings.

Convenience stores and other retail companies which formerly operated under the LG logo were rebranded as "GS", which like "LG", comes from the old name, "Lucky-Goldstar".

In December 2005, the company acquired 70% of the shares of GS EPS Co., Ltd. (formerly LG Energy Co., Ltd.) from GS E&C Corporation and LG International Corp.

Affiliates
The subsidiaries of GS Holdings are as follows:

Energy and Power
 GS Energy
 GS Caltex
 GS EPS
 GS E&R

Retail and service
 GS Retail
 GS25
 GS Sports
 FC Seoul
 GS Caltex Seoul KIXX

Construction and infrastructure
 GS Engineering & Construction
 GS Global

GS E&C
GS Engineering & Construction Corporation is a Korea-based global EPC contractor having wide range of experience in refineries, gas and petrochemical plants providing design and construction services. It has been engaged in the fields of architecture, civil engineering, building materials, housing, plant, environment, and power plant across the globe. It operates through Civil Works, Architectural Construction & Housing, Plant Construction, Power, Hotel, and other segments.

The company has been working as an engineering-procurement-construction contractor working in the fields of oil, gas, and petrochemical projects; designs and environmental facilities (sewage system maintenance, and sewage and wastewater treatment; building industrial incineration facilities). It provides a solution for providing EPC and commissioning of thermal and combined cycle power plant projects; and combined heat power and district heating plants, as well as nuclear power projects.

References

External links

 

 
Chaebol
Companies of South Korea
South Korean brands
Conglomerate companies established in 2005
Companies listed on the Korea Exchange
Companies based in Seoul
Multinational companies headquartered in South Korea